The Narrows is the eighth studio album by American singer-songwriter Grant-Lee Phillips. It was released on March 18, 2016 under Yep Roc Records.

Critical reception
The Narrows was met with "universal acclaim" reviews from critics. At Metacritic, which assigns a weighted average rating out of 100 to reviews from mainstream publications, this release received an average score of 83, based on 8 reviews. Aggregator Album of the Year gave the release a 79 out of 100 based on a critical consensus of 6 reviews.

Track listing

Personnel

Musicians
 Grant-Lee Phillips – primary artist, guitar, vocals, producer
 Lex Price – bass, guitar, backing vocals
 Jerry Roe – drums, backing vocals
 Jamie Edwards – organ
 Eric Gorfain – fiddle
 Russ Pahl – guitar

Production
 John Baldwin – mastering
 Collin Dupuis – engineer, mixing

Charts

References

2016 albums
Grant-Lee Phillips albums
Yep Roc Records albums